Marko Popović (born March 3, 1984) is a Serbian professional basketball player, who last played for Sloga of the Basketball League of Serbia.

References

External links
 Eurobasket profile
 RealGM profile
 Proballers profile
 FIBA Profile
 ACB Profile

1984 births
Living people
Basketball League of Serbia players
Guards (basketball)
Liga ACB players
Olympia Larissa B.C. players
KK Beopetrol/Atlas Beograd players
KK Ergonom players
KK Vojvodina Srbijagas players
KK Napredak Kruševac players
KK Smederevo players
KK Sloga players
KK Zastava players
KK Sutjeska players
Basketball players from Sarajevo
Serbian expatriate basketball people in Georgia (country)
Serbian expatriate basketball people in Greece
Serbian expatriate basketball people in Iran
Serbian expatriate basketball people in Montenegro
Serbian expatriate basketball people in Slovenia
Serbian expatriate basketball people in Spain
Serbian expatriate basketball people in North Macedonia
Serbian men's basketball players
Serbs of Bosnia and Herzegovina
Start Lublin players